Coleorrhyncha or Peloridiomorpha, also known as moss bugs or beetle bugs, are a suborder of Hemiptera and represent an ancient lineage of moss-feeding insects. They show some similarities to the Heteroptera but have been considered distinct. It has a single extant family, the Peloridiidae. They have wings in some species which are reduced in others but all species are flightless and live in damp moss habitats and are associated with the distribution of Nothofagus trees in Australia, New Zealand, New Caledonia, and South America, which all were formerly part of the supercontinent Gondwana.

Three other major families have been established on the basis of fossils: Progonocimicidae (Late Permian to Late Cretaceous) Karabasiidae (Jurassic-Early Cretaceous) and Hoploridiidae (Early Cretaceous), which have been found in both the Northern and Southern Hemispheres. The oldest member of Coleorrhyncha is Permoridium from the early Permian (Asselian to early Sakmarian ~290-300 million years ago) of Germany, which appears to be more closely related to Peloridiidae than to any of the extinct families. The Coleorrhyncha were earlier included within the "Homoptera" but based on studies of their morphological similarities as well as molecular phylogeny are now considered as a sister group of the Heteroptera.

The fossil family Progonocimicidae was formerly considered as early Heteroptera or survivors from a stem group of Heteropteroides but based on morphology, Popov called them an ancestral sub-group of the Coleorrhyncha, and this has been followed by subsequent authors.

References

Other reading
 
 
 
 
 

 
Hemiptera
Insect suborders
Extant Middle Jurassic first appearances